James Ramsey Ullman (August 21, 1907 – June 20, 1971) was an American writer and mountaineer. He was born in New York City.  He was not a "high end" climber, but his writing made him an honorary member of that circle.

Most of his books were about mountaineering and geography.

His works include Banner in the Sky, which was a book based on the true story of the first climbing of the Matterhorn (it was filmed in Switzerland as Third Man on the Mountain), and The White Tower (which would star Glenn Ford and Lloyd Bridges).
See Americans on Everest by James Ramsay Ullman he was short (page 195), published by  J. B. Lippincott Company in 1964; Library of Congress Catalogue #64-14475.

High Conquest was the first of nine books for the J.B. Lippincott company coming out in 1941 followed by The White Tower, River of The Sun, Windom's Way, and Banner in the Sky which was a 1955 Newbery Honor book. All of these titles became small motion pictures.

Ullman  was the ghost writer for Tenzing Norgay's 1955 autobiography Man of Everest (originally published as Tiger of the Snows) and for John Harlin's biography Straight Up.

He also wrote the short story "Top Man", a story about mountaineers climbing K3, a mountain in India. The story appears in several anthologies. It was originally published in the Saturday Evening Post in 1940. Issue #35.

Beyond his mountaineering books, he wrote "Where the Bong Tree Grows," an account of a year he spent travelling through some of the most remote islands of the South Pacific. Ullman also wrote a novel about the poet Arthur Rimbaud, The Day on Fire (1958).

He joined the 1963 American Mount Everest Expedition 1963 as an official historian. On 1 May 1963 Jim Whittaker was the first American to reach the summit with Nawang Gombu (a nephew of Tenzing Norgay. Because of health problems Ullman had to stay in Kathmandu. His book Americans on Everest: The Official Account of the Ascent was published in 1964.

Ullman died in Boston from cancer on July 5, 1971.  His papers, which include an archive regarding Temple Fielding, are at Princeton University.

References

Sources
Time Milestones

External links

 
 

American mountain climbers
1907 births
1971 deaths
20th-century American novelists
American male novelists
Newbery Honor winners
Novelists from New York (state)
Sportspeople from New York (state)
Ghostwriters
Deaths from cancer in Massachusetts
20th-century American biographers
20th-century American male writers
American male biographers